The Centre d'Enseignement Français en Afghanistan (CEFA) consists of two Franco-Afghan schools in the center of Kabul, Afghanistan, together educating around 6,000 Afghan students.

The Lycée Esteqlal ( English: Esteqlal High School) is a Franco-Afghan school in Kabul, Afghanistan. It is the second oldest school (after Habibia High School) in Kabul, and is recognized as the most prestigious school in the country.

Lycée Esteqlal is a public school, administered by the Afghan Ministry of Education, and is currently under the contract of AEFE, an educational agency of the French Foreign Ministry. The French Cultural Center (CCF) is also located inside the Lycée Esteqlal compound.

Further information
Created under the impulse of King Amanullah in 1922 as Amaniya School, it was renamed in 1931 to Lycée Esteqlal (meaning "independence" in Persian). In 1968, French Prime Minister Georges Pompidou laid the first brick of modern buildings, and the new site was inaugurated in 1974. The curriculum was entirely in the French language until 1985 when diplomatic relations between France and Afghanistan were suspended under the communist regime. Since 2002, only a few subjects, such as French language, mathematics and physics, are taught in French, and the rest in Persian.

Until 1985, Lycée Esteqlal did not only receive Afghan students, but also several French nationals who were related to the French Embassy's diplomatic staff. Lycée Esteqlal along with Lycée Malalaï, which is the other Franco-Afghan school for girls in Kabul were rebuilt and reopened at the beginning of 2003, and currently they are under the contract of Agence pour l'enseignement français à l'étranger.

King Amanullah, who was progressive and democratic also oversaw the opening of the first girls school, Masturat, in 1921. Masturat was closed between 1928 and 1932, then reopened in 1932 through the efforts of the new King Nadir Shah and became a girls secondary school in 1939, led by a French teacher. Seven hours a week of French was taught from the primary year upwards. In 1942, the school moved to a new building and took the name of Lycée Malalai, from the name of a famous Afghan woman who fought in the resistance against the invading English in 1880 during the Second Anglo-Afghan War.

In 2014 a suicide bomber attacked a cultural center at Esteqlal High School, killing a German national and injuring 16. One of the injured was musician Ahmad Naser Sarmast.

Notable alumni
Many internationally renowned Afghan personalities and figures have received part of their education or have obtained their baccalaureate in Lycée Esteqlal.
Ahmad Shah Khan, crown prince of Afghanistan
Ahmad Shah Massoud, renowned Afghan anti-Soviet resistance leader
Amin Wardak, mujahideen leader
Atiq Rahimi, well-known French-Afghan writer
Eklil Ahmad Hakimi, former deputy minister of foreign affairs
Homayun Tandar, Afghan ambassador
Mohammed Akram, former minister of education and ambassador in France
Mohammed Kassem Fazelly, lawyer, professor, ambassador to UN 
Mahmoud Saikal, former Afghan permanent representative to the UN
Mohammed Sediq Farhang, civil servant, historian
Muhammed Akbar Khan, crown prince of Afghanistan
Nur Ahmad Etemadi, former Afghan prime minister
Ravan A. G. Farhâdi, former ambassador to the UN, renowned writer, researcher, and professor
Zalmai Rassoul, former Afghan foreign affairs minister 
Zemaryalai Tarzi, internationally renowned archaeologist and professor

Notes

External links

 Official website of Lycée Esteqlal
 Website by the French pedagogical team for Esteqlal and Malalai schools http://www.esteqlal-malalai.org/topic/index.html

AEFE contracted schools
International schools in Afghanistan
French international schools in Asia
Schools in Kabul
Educational institutions established in 1922
1922 establishments in Afghanistan